The Chinese biological weapons program is a biological weapons program reported to have been active in the 1980s, and suspected by some governments and security analysts to remain covertly active. China is currently a signatory of the Biological Weapons Convention (BWC) and Chinese officials have stated that China has never engaged in biological activities with offensive military applications. China was reported to have had an active biological weapons program in the 1980s. Members of the US intelligence community heavily suspect that the state of China had, as of 2015, at least 42 facilities that may be involved in research, development, production, or  testing  of biological agents.

Background 

Kanatjan Alibekov, former director of one of the Soviet germ-warfare programs, said that China suffered a serious accident at one of its biological weapons plants in the late 1980s. Alibekov asserted that Soviet reconnaissance satellites identified a biological weapons laboratory and plant near a site for testing nuclear warheads. The Soviets suspected that two separate epidemics of hemorrhagic fever that swept the region in the late 1980s were caused by an accident in a lab where Chinese scientists were weaponizing viral diseases.

US Secretary of State Madeleine Albright expressed her concerns over possible Chinese biological weapon transfers to Iran and other nations in a letter to Senator Bob Bennett (R-Utah) in January 1997. Albright stated that she had received reports regarding transfers of dual-use items from Chinese entities to the Iranian government which concerned her and that the United States had to encourage China to adopt comprehensive export controls to prevent assistance to Iran's alleged biological weapons program. The United States acted upon the allegations on January 16, 2002, when it imposed sanctions on three Chinese firms accused of supplying Iran with materials used in the manufacture of chemical and biological weapons. In response to this, China issued export control protocols on dual use biological technology in late 2002.

A large-scale Chinese state-run biological weapons program was reported to exist as recently as 2015, based on analysis from former IDF military intelligence officer Dany Shoham, integrating the findings of several different countries' defence agencies. The program reportedly includes at least 42 facilities that are involved in research, development, production, or  testing  of biological weapons (30 associated with the People's Liberation Army and 12 associated with the Chinese defense ministry). US intelligence agencies assumed as early as 1993 that the state of China had an operational, secretive, and sizable bioweapons arsenal that is "extremely hidden" but continuously upgraded.

The official position of the US Department of State, as published in a 2021 report, is that China likely operated an offensive bioweapons program before the 1984 signing of the BWC treaty, and continued to operate the program afterwards. The report also expresses concern that China may have transferred controlled biological weapons-related items to nations of international concern (e.g. Iran).

According to Nuclear Threat Initiative, no evidence of the program's existence has been officially released.

References

See also  
 United States biological weapons program
 Soviet biological weapons program

Weapons of the Republic of China